Conus pauperculus is a species of sea snail, a marine gastropod mollusk in the family Conidae, the cone snails and their allies.

Like all species within the genus Conus, these snails are predatory and venomous. They are capable of "stinging" humans, therefore live ones should be handled carefully or not at all.

Description
The size of the shell varies between 20 mm and 40 mm. The thin shell is narrow. Its color is olivaceous, with a flesh-colored central band, and numerous revolving series of small chestnut spots.

Distribution
This marine species occurs off Okinawa, Japan

References

 Filmer R.M. (2010) A taxonomic review of the Conus boeticus Reeve complex (Gastropoda - Conidae). Visaya 2(6): 21-80 page(s): 22
 Puillandre N., Duda T.F., Meyer C., Olivera B.M. & Bouchet P. (2015). One, four or 100 genera? A new classification of the cone snails. Journal of Molluscan Studies. 81: 1-23

External links
 To Biodiversity Heritage Library (7 publications)
 To Encyclopedia of Life
 To USNM Invertebrate Zoology Mollusca Collection
 To World Register of Marine Species
 Cone Shells - Knights of the Sea
 

pauperculus
Gastropods described in 1834